Leidyosuchus (meaning "Leidy's crocodile") is an extinct genus of alligatoroid from the Late Cretaceous of Alberta. It was named in 1907 by Lawrence Lambe, and the type species is L. canadensis. It is known from a number of specimens from the middle Campanian age Dinosaur Park Formation. It was a medium-sized alligatorid, with a maximum skull length greater than 40 centimeters (16 in).

A number of species had been assigned to this genus over the years, including: L. acutidentatus (Sternberg, 1932), from the Paleocene of Saskatchewan; L. formidabilis (Erickson, 1976), from the Paleocene of North Dakota and Wyoming; L. gilmorei (Mook, 1942), from the Campanian of Alberta; L. multidentatus (Mook, 1930); L. riggsi (Schmidt, 1938); L. sternbergii (Gilmore, 1910), from the Maastrichtian (Late Cretaceous) of Colorado, Montana, North Dakota, South Dakota, and Wyoming; and L. wilsoni (Mook, 1959), from the Eocene of Wyoming. However, in 1997 Chris Brochu reevaluated the genus and reassigned most of the species, transferring L. acutidentatus, L. formidabilis, L. sternbergii, and L. wilsoni to the new genus Borealosuchus, and L. multidentatus to the new genus Listrognathosuchus, proposing L. gilmorei as a synonym of L. canadensis, and finding L. riggsi to be too fragmentary to be determinable.

Leidyosuchus is one of the basal-most members of the superfamily Alligatoroidea. Leidyosuchus's placement within Alligatoroidea can be shown in the cladogram below, based on a 2018 tip dating study by Lee & Yates that simultaneously used morphological, molecular (DNA sequencing), and stratigraphic (fossil age) data.

References

Crocodilians
Taxa named by Lawrence Lambe
Late Cretaceous crocodylomorphs of North America
Late Cretaceous reptiles of North America
Fossils of Canada
Paleontology in Alberta
Fossil taxa described in 1907
Prehistoric pseudosuchian genera